1984 Batticaloa Jailbreak, was carried out by Ramalingam Paramadeva of Tamil Tigers to release a female political inmate, Nirmala Nithiyananthan, who was left behind in the 1983 Batticaloa Jailbreak, this incident happened on 10 June 1984. Paramadeva and his men dressed in prison guard uniform, fooled & overpowered the guards and released the inmate.

See also

Welikada prison massacre 
Black July
Sri Lankan Civil War
LTTE

References

Liberation Tigers of Tamil Eelam

Escapes
History of Sri Lanka (1948–present)
Batticaloa Jailbreak